Madonna and Child is a 1499-1502 oil on panel painting by Cima da Conegliano, now in the Detroit Institute of Arts, to which it was given in 1889 by James E. Scripps, having been in Scottish and English collections since around 1842. it is signed at bottom right JOANNES BTA CONEGLANENSIS.

References

Detroit
Paintings in the collection of the Detroit Institute of Arts
1490s paintings
1500s paintings